James Hilterbrand (born 21 May 1989) is an Australian-born United States international rugby union player, currently playing for New South Wales Shute Shield side Manly and the United States rugby union team. His regular position is hooker, however he can also play as a prop.

Youth
Hilterbrand was born and grew up in Adelaide, South Australia, and played for South Australia at junior rugby level. He represented them at Under-16 level in 2004 and 2005, at Under-18 level in the Australian Schools Championship Division II in 2005 and 2006, and at Under-21 level in 2007.

Playing career

Manly
Hilterbrand then moved to Sydney, where he joined Shute Shield side Manly for the 2008 season. He played for their Colts side in 2008, before working his way up the various grade levels, breaking into their Grade I side in 2011 as they reached the semi-final of the Shute Shield.

Hilterbrand was the regular starting hooker for Manly in the 2012 Shute Shield, helping them to second position on the ladder before they were eliminated from the competition by Southern Districts in the preliminary final. He was also selected to represent a Sydney Anchors team against NSW Country.

Western Force

Hilterbrand moved to Perth to join the Western Force on an Extended Playing Squad contract for the 2013 Super Rugby season. He was named on the bench for a further five matches in the competition, but failed to make an appearance in any of those. He featured in one more match in the competition, starting their 21–15 victory over the Brumbies in Perth.

At the conclusion of the 2013 Super Rugby season, Hilterbrand returned to Sydney to make four appearances for Manly in the 2013 Shute Shield.

Edinburgh

On 26 August 2013, Scottish Pro12 side Edinburgh confirmed that Hilterbrand joined them on a two-year contract. He made his debut for Edinburgh in their 2013–14 Pro12 Round Three match against Welsh side Ospreys, coming on for the final sixteen minutes as they suffered a 10–44 loss. He made a total of thirteen appearances in the competition, starting two of those, as Edinburgh finished the competition in 8th place in the table. He also made one appearance for Edinburgh in the 2013–14 Heineken Cup in their 12–23 defeat to Gloucester.

Hilterbrand made ten appearances for Edinburgh in the 2014–15 Pro12 competition, as they matched their 2013–14 performance by finishing in eighth position in the table. He also made appearances against  and London Welsh in the 2014–15 European Rugby Challenge Cup, in which Edinburgh finished top of their group.

Hilterbrand left the Scottish club at the end of the 2014–15 season and returned to Australia to once again represent Manly in the Shute Shield competition, making nine appearances. He returned to Edinburgh on a temporary contract as cover during the 2015 Rugby World Cup; however, he failed to make any competitive appearances for the side. He was also named in the  squad for the 2015 National Rugby Championship, but failed to feature in the competition.

Kings

In November 2015, it was announced that Hilterbrand was one of South African Super Rugby side the ' new acquisitions prior to the 2016 Super Rugby season.

International
Hilterbrand was born in Australia and represented their Under-18 team in 2007.

In February 2016, United States head coach John Mitchell included Hilterbrand as a reserve in the matchday squad for their opening match of the 2016 Americas Rugby Championship against , but he failed to make an appearance in the match.
He made his international debut off the bench against Canada the following week. Hilterbrand retired from international rugby following the 2019 Rugby World Cup

References

Australian rugby union players
American rugby union players
United States international rugby union players
Living people
1989 births
Sportspeople from Adelaide
Rugby union props
Rugby union hookers
Edinburgh Rugby players
Western Force players
New South Wales Waratahs players
Australian people of Scottish descent
Australian expatriate rugby union players
Expatriate rugby union players in Scotland
Australian expatriate sportspeople in Scotland
Sydney (NRC team) players
San Diego Legion players